The Purple Prince of Oz (1932) is the 26th in the series of Oz books created by L. Frank Baum and his successors, and the 12th written by Ruth Plumly Thompson. It was illustrated by John R. Neill.

While visiting the neighboring kingdom of Pumperdink (incognito), Prince Randy of Regalia criticizes the king's grapes, claiming they are sour. Randy is sentenced to be "dipped" in a purple well, but Kabumpo, the Elegant Elephant makes him his attendant instead. Later, the royal family of Pumperdink gets enchanted by an evil fairy, and Randy and Kabumpo must escape and save the day, with the help of the Red Jinn.  At the same time, Randy must earn his crown as Prince of Regalia, by accomplishing the seven challenging tasks required by the law of Regalia.

This is the first of Thompson's Oz books to carry the entire story (except for a bit at the very end) on characters of her own creation.  The unpredictable, hot-tempered Jinnicky the Red Jinn from Jack Pumpkinhead of Oz returns as a much more pleasant companion to Randy, and soon becomes a popular character.

The Silver Princess in Oz is a direct sequel to this book, reuniting readers with Randy, Kabumpo, and Jinnicky.

References

External links
 On The Purple Prince of Oz

1932 American novels
1932 children's books
1932 fantasy novels
Fictional princes
Jinn in popular culture
Oz (franchise) books